The South Wales Coast and Severn Estuary Coastal Path covers Region H of the larger Wales Coast Path, an  long-distance walking route around the whole coast of Wales which opened on 5 May 2012. With five local councils involved in its creation and maintenance, the route goes through a heritage coast, three national nature reserves and three heritage landscapes.

Local councils
The path passes through five unitary authority areas, and each council has responsibility for establishing and maintaining the waymarked path. From west to east, it Bridgend County Borough Council, Vale of Glamorgan Council, Cardiff Council, Newport City Council and Monmouthshire County Council. As one of the sections of Welsh coastline newest to long-distance paths, the path was officially opened at the same time as the 2012 launch of the Wales Coastal Path. The  length of coast path through Bridgend County Borough was officially opened on 17 October 2013.

The total number of people using the Wales Coast Path (October 2011 to September 2012) in Momouthshire, Newport, Cardiff, Vale of Glamorgan and Bridgend was over 1,429,000 as compared to 102,721 using the Pembrokeshire Coast Path.

The route

From the Neath Port Talbot border on the River Kenfig, the path crosses the Kenfig sands to Porthcawl and  travels through the Glamorgan Heritage Coast, which gained Heritage Coast status in 1972. This leads to Barry and Penarth. The path then travels through Cardiff Bay, along the coastline to the River Usk which requires going inland along the river to the bridge at Newport and further on to Newport Wetlands National Nature Reserve (with more than 100,000 birds), on the banks of the Severn Estuary, which has the second highest tidal range in the world at 15 metres (49 feet). It ends at Chepstow where it meets the  Offa’s Dyke Path, alongside the Anglo Welsh border, linking the Severn estuary with the Irish Sea at Prestatyn.

Protected sites and landscapes
In addition to the Glamorgan Heritage Coast, the path takes in three national nature reserves: Kenfig Pool & Dunes (Bridgend), (Merthyr Mawr Warren) Bridgend, and Newport Wetlands (Newport). It also passes through three Heritage Landscapes: Merthyr Mawr and Kenfig Margam Burrows (which stretches from Neath Port Talbot through Bridgend to Vale of Glamorgan), Caldicot and Wentloog Levels (Cardiff, Newport, Monmouthshire), and Lower Wye Valley (Monmouthshire).

See also
Severn bore

References

Geography of Bridgend County Borough
Geography of Cardiff
Geography of Newport, Wales
Geography of Monmouthshire
Recreational walks in Wales
Long-distance footpaths in Wales
Coastal paths in Wales